John Bean may refer to:
John Bean (cricketer) (1913–2005), English cricketer and British Army officer
John Bean (politician) (1927–2021), long-standing participant in the British far right
John Bean (explorer) ( 1751–1757), Canadian explorer and mariner employed by the Hudson's Bay Company
John Bean (cinematographer) (1963–2011), Australian cinematographer
John William Bean (1824–1882), British criminal who attempted to assassinate Queen Victoria

See also
John Beane ( 1503–1580), English politician